Kathy Talbot (born 17 August 1961) is a British rowing coxswain. She competed in the women's coxed four event at the 1984 Summer Olympics.

References

External links
 

1961 births
Living people
British female rowers
Olympic rowers of Great Britain
Rowers at the 1984 Summer Olympics
Sportspeople from Woking
Coxswains (rowing)